One Minute Silence is an Irish four-piece rap metal/nu metal band based in London, England. The band consists of vocalist Brian 'Yap' Barry from Templemore, County Tipperary, guitarist Massimo Fiocco from London, drummer Martin Davies and bass guitarist Glen Diani from Gibraltar. The band announced its split after eight years in a press release dated 21 October 2003. The band officially reconvened without original drummer Eddie Stratton in 2011. Although the band members claimed not to be a "political band" — they are simply "political people" who are also musicians, they say – the group's lyrics have a political message which can be interpreted as generally anti-capitalist and anarchist.

Biography

Formation and early days (1995–1996) 
One Minute Silence came together in the early 1990s when Irish vocalist Brian Barry got together with guitarist Chris Ignatiou from London, under the name "Near Death Experience". After working with various rhythm sections, they settled with Gibraltarian Glen Diani on bass guitar and Englishman Eddie Stratton on drums. Barry had befriended Stratton before the formation of the band. The band was soon forced to change its name because of an American group who shared it, and so it became One Minute Silence. That name, originally intended to be the title of a song, was chosen to parody the practice of having a one-minute silence as a mark of respect when someone considered "important or well respected" dies. The band felt that that respect was often "misplaced".

Big Cat Records and Available in All Colors (1997–1998) 
The band signed a recording contract with Big Cat Records in 1997 and released Available in All Colors the following year.

Payne's departure and Buy Now... Saved Later (1999–2001) 
Buy Now... Saved Later followed in 2000 after an amicable split with Ignatiou (now employed by MI6), who was ultimately replaced by Italian Massimo Fiocco, known as Massy, after original replacement Kee Payne left the band in 1999. This second album represented a noticeable step in the band's musical progression: the record's production quality and style differed from that of the first, which had used a hip-hop producer. Buy Now... sounded more like a metal album. With its well-rounded production and matured song-writing, Buy Now... sent the band on a tour of the US, with notable acts such as Slipknot and Mudvayne, the latter touring with them in the UK as supporting act.

One Lie Fits All and break-up (2002–2003) 
After circulating a three-track demo and signing a deal with Taste Media, the band started recording sessions for their third album in autumn 2002.

A single, "We Bounce", was released on 31 March 2003, with a third album, titled One Lie Fits All, following on 7 July that year. According to the band's now-defunct website "[t]his name continues the pattern of manipulating well known marketing slogans in order to present a political statement".

One Lie Fits All showed a new direction for the band. Barry's rapping gave way to much more singing on tracks like "Price of the King's Ticket". There are still the thunderous live songs like "We Bounce" and "I Wear My Skin".

Between these releases, One Minute Silence had toured extensively, though the last tour had to be cancelled. The group's following came largely from their energetic live shows – they have been voted "Best British Live Act" in Kerrang! magazine.

In October 2003, the band announced its split:

Although we are still the best of friends, and cannot rule out the possibility of working together in the future, for now we are dispersing to pursue other projects and interests. We're still in love, we're just not married any more!! There are no musical differences, and no personal conflicts affecting our friendship with each other, just a desire to branch out and explore other areas of life and music.

The band would like to extend their infinite love and respect to those who have championed OMS over the years, whether from within the industry and the media or from without. Your support has been life-giving. An extra-special acknowledgement is due to the people who have come to our shows, and especially to the people in the pit, because without you there would have been no OMS, and without people to listen, music would be meaningless. You rule, we love you, and we miss you already!!

Looking to the future; Yap is going full-throttle into spoken word performances, and he is also working on a number of political and philosophical media projects.

Glen Diani and Massy Fiocco are currently considering and inviting other options. Eddie Stratton is currently filling in on drums with his friends in New Disease.

After One Minute Silence's break-up, Yap followed his spoken-word career, appearing on BBC Radio 4's Bespoken Word.

Post-One Minute Silence (2004–2010) 
After One Minute Silence, Barry began to write and perform new material as a slam poet and public speaker. The new material began to grow into a music project when he met producer John Hendicott and vocalist Donna Williams in 2005. A new band, Pink Punk, was formed and in 2006 the first album, Zoo Politics, emerged as an independent release on Freeport Records. The band's website, PPunk.com, went live later in 2006 and by the end of the year the album was on iTunes, Napster and more than 7000 digital retailers worldwide through Universal Digital and IODA (US). Pink Punk had a live show in late 2007.

In March 2008, vocalist Barry touched on the issue of a possible reunion and fourth album in an article posted on the band's unofficial Myspace page.

In 2008, Edwin Stratton was suffering severely from coeliac disease. He was arrested in mid-2008 after fire investigators, looking into a fire in a wine bar below his Leyton apartment, discovered cannabis plants in his home. Stratton stated that he was growing for medical use, but was charged with producing the drug cannabis, exposing him to a potential maximum sentence of 14 years in prison. Snaresbrook Crown Court handed down a sentence of three months in prison, suspended for one year with £500 costs, and prohibited Stratton from owning hydroponic equipment for one year. In November 2008, he was due to appear at the Waltham Forest Magistrates' Court and challenge the charge as a contravention of Article 14 of the Human Rights Act, which prohibits discrimination on any grounds.

Reformation (2011–present) 
According to a post made on 25 May 2010 on the band's Myspace page, Barry, Diani and Fiocco are recording new material with new drummer Martin Davies. New pictures have also appeared on the band's Myspace of the band rehearsing.

On 10 January 2011, One Minute Silence announced their official reformation and tour with new material also in the pipeline. Band members for the tour and record are Barry, Fiocco, Diani and Davies.

In early February 2011, it was announced that One Minute Silence would be playing at Sonisphere Festival.

On 9 June 2011, One Minute Silence announced the cancellation of their appearance at Sonisphere Festival, due to 'life complexities'.

On 4 July 2011, the band announced their intention to record, film and release a new live album "One Minute Silence: Live in the Studio", with a release date set for Spring 2012. Fans were given the opportunity to get involved through PledgeMusic, with 50 fans standing a chance of being invited to the recording.

Live in the Studio will be released sometime in 2012, possibly during Spring. According to One Minute Silence's PledgeMusic page, Live in the Studio is "sounding huge" and there are "several tracks from the back catalogue that are being worked on as well". Having initially worked with Drum n' Bass producer DJ Technical Itch on Pink Punk the band discussed working with him on the new PledgeMusic project but were then introduced by Tech Itch to Dominic Angas aka Dom and Roland with whom the band were working.

In July 2012, it was announced that One Minute Silence is working on an EP titled Fragmented Armageddon due for release in Summer 2012. On the band's PledgeMusic page, it is stated that all the artwork has been designed and the band is "putting the final touches to the website and merch materials".

Fragmented Armageddon EP was released on 3 May 2013.

Discography

Albums 

 One Minute Silence: Live in the Studio was released in 2013 via PledgeMusic as an incentive for fans to donate to the band's costs of recording a new EP. It is a live album with new songs.

EPs

Singles

References

External links

Kerrang! Awards winners
Musical groups established in 1995
Musical groups disestablished in 2003
Musical groups reestablished in 2011
Nu metal musical groups
Rap metal musical groups